The  (formerly Osaka Kōsei Nenkin Kaikan) is a 2,400-seat concert hall in Nishi-ku, Osaka, Japan. Artists that performed in the main hall include Black Sabbath, Kiss, Pink Floyd, Deep Purple, Whitesnake, Robin Trower, Rainbow, Queen, Santana, The Jackson 5, James Brown, UFO, Iron Maiden, Red Velvet and NCT 127. It officially opened on 14 April 1968 and was the largest concert hall in Osaka at the time. The complex included a smaller hall, lodging facilities and two restaurants. The building was sold in October 2009 to Orix Real Estate, who currently run it under the name the Orix Theater.

References

Concert halls in Japan
Music in Osaka
Buildings and structures in Osaka
Music venues completed in 1968
1968 establishments in Japan